Senator Vincent may refer to:

Beverly M. Vincent (1890–1980), Kentucky State Senate 
Chas Vincent (born 1977), Montana State Senate
Edward Vincent Jr. (1934–2012), California State Senate